Francis Xavier Warfield (April 26, 1897 – July 24, 1932) was an infielder and manager in the Negro leagues.

Career
Standing at just 5'7", Warfield was known primarily for his fielding and baserunning excellence, but he also had several good years at the plate. In 1922, he hit .342 for the Detroit Stars. He played on the Hilldale teams that won the Eastern Colored League pennants from 1923 to 1925, with Warfield being the manager for two of them.

Warfield became player-manager of the Baltimore Black Sox in 1929 and led them to the Negro American League championship. He and teammates Oliver Marcelle, Dick Lundy, and Jud Wilson became known as the "Million Dollar Infield" because their collective talents may have been worth $1,000,000 to the major leagues had they been white. Baseball writer Bill James ranked Warfield as the eighth-greatest second baseman in negro league history, calling him a "complete defensive wizard".

Warfield was known to have a violent nature that led to arguments, and he once bit off part of Oliver Marcelle's nose in a fight over a dice game.

Warfield died of a heart attack in 1932.

Twenty years after his death, Warfield received votes listing him on the 1952 Pittsburgh Courier player-voted poll of the Negro Leagues' best players ever.

References

External links
 and Baseball-Reference Black Baseball stats and Seamheads
  and Seamheads
Negro League Baseball Players Association biography

1897 births
1932 deaths
Negro league baseball managers
Indianapolis ABCs players
Leopardos de Santa Clara players
St. Louis Giants players
Dayton Marcos players
Detroit Stars players
Hilldale Club players
Baltimore Black Sox players
Baseball players from Indianapolis
American expatriate baseball players in Cuba
20th-century African-American sportspeople